Something Quite Peculiar is the debut album by The Dear & Departed. The album was released May 22, 2007, on Science Records. It features the single "Tonight's the Night" and a cover of The Church's "Under the Milky Way". It was recorded in November and December 2006 at the Mouse House (Pasadena, CA), Hurley Studio (Costa Mesa, CA) and Chris Vrenna's private studio (Eagle Rock, CA).

Track listing

B-sides
1. "Day to Day"

2. "If You Say So"

3. "Run Away"

Personnel 
Band members
Dan Under – vocals, backing vocals
Simon O'Gorman – guitar
Joel Bourne – drums
Darren Parkinson – guitar
David Williams – bass, backing vocals

Guest musicians
Steven Looker – backing vocals
Anthony Navarro – backing vocals
Matt Baker – keyboards
Dallas Green – vocals on "To Cut a Long Story Short"
Jessica Origliasso – vocals on "Under the Milky Way"
Roxy Buster – vocals on "Bordering on Ordinary" & "Return to Sender".
Isabelle Buster – vocals  on "Return to Sender".

Technical staff
Chris Vrenna – producer, engineer
Jade Puget – producer 
Kevin Estrada – cover photography
Roc Aguilar – band photography
Scott Wade – art direction & design

References

2007 debut albums
Albums produced by Chris Vrenna
The Dear & Departed albums